WestLB AG (derived from Westdeutsche Landesbank, i.e. "Western German state Bank")  was a European commercial bank based in Düsseldorf, Germany which was mainly owned by the German state of North Rhine-Westphalia. Landesbanks are a group of partly or wholly state owned banks unique to Germany. They are regionally organised and their business is predominantly wholesale banking. As of 30 June 2012, WestLB was downsized and Portigon Financial Services AG became the legal successor of WestLB.

History 
The bank was incorporated on January 1, 1969. Total assets of the group were €288.1 bn as of December 31, 2008 (€292.1bn as of September 30, 2006) with operations spread over eleven countries in Europe, six countries in The Americas, six countries in Asia, Australia and South Africa, including significant investment banking operations in New York City, London, Luxembourg, Tokyo and Hong Kong.

WestLB was also the central institution for savings banks in North Rhine Westphalia. On August 30, 2002, WestLB was transformed into an Aktiengesellschaft (joint stock company) and on July 19, 2005, institutional liability and guarantor liability were abolished, allowing the company to concentrate on commercial operations.

The public finance tasks of economic and structural development were transferred to the NRW.BANK which now operates as the Landesbank of North Rhine Westphalia. In February 2008, as the global credit crisis evolved, WestLB was allocated a 5bn Euros guarantee by North Rhine Westphalia and a group of local banks. The bank was reported to have suffered from exposure to investments in structured credits.

In November 2008, the board of WestLB announced that it intended to obtain state loan guarantees and look at raising additional capital from the government of Germany specially set up bailout fund. There are also any ideas to merge the WestLB with other state owned banks or to rearrange segments of the WestLB in the German system of state owned banks.

In November 2009, 85 billion in problem assets were transferred from WestLB to a winding up agency called Erste Abwicklungsanstalt (EAA), colloquially also called 'bad bank'.

As per 30 June 2012, the brand WestLB was given up and the remaining company continued to operate under the name of Portigon Financial Services AG. Besides, EAA and another organisation under the roof of Hessian and Thuringian Landesbank Helaba are dealing with the aftermath of the quasi bankruptcy and carrying on with core functions of the former WestLB.

Stockholders 
Stockholders on May 10, 2009

 30.862% NRW.BANK (also partly owned by North Rhine-Westphalia)
 25.032% Sparkassen- und Giroverband Rheinland
 25.032% Sparkassen- und Giroverband Westfalen-Lippe
 17.766% North Rhine-Westphalia

TWG suspicions
In January 2001 after West LB had notified banking investigators about very large sums moving between offshore vehicles and Trans World Group accounts at West LB, Düsseldorf prosecutors uncovered DM15 billion ($7 billion) had passed through West LB, Commerzbank, Dresdner Bank, and Deutsche Bank.

References

External links
 
 
 

Landesbanks
Companies listed on the Frankfurt Stock Exchange
Companies based in Düsseldorf
1969 establishments in West Germany
Banks established in 1969